is a former Japanese football player and manager. She played for Japan national team.

Club career
Obe was born in Sakaiminato on February 15, 1975. She joined Nikko Securities Dream Ladies in 1991. She was selected Young Player Awards in 1991 and Best Eleven for 4 years in a row (1995-1998). The club also won L.League championship for 3 years in a row (1996-1998). However, the club was disbanded in 1998 due to financial strain. She moved to OKI FC Winds in 1999. But the club was disbanded end of season. She moved to YKK Tohoku Ladies SC Flappers (later TEPCO Mareeze). End of 2006 season, she retired. She was selected Best Eleven total 7 times.

National team career
On August 21, 1991, when Obe was 16 years old, she debuted for Japan national team against China. She was a member of Japan for 1991, 1995, 2003 World Cup, 1996 and 2004 Summer Olympics. She played at 1993, 1995, 1997, 1999, 2001, 2003 AFC Championship, 1998 and 2002 Asian Games. She played 85 games and scored 6 goals for Japan until 2004. She was also the captain.

Coaching career
At TEPCO Mareeze, when Obe was a player, club manager Takahiro Kimura end of 2006 L.League season in November. She managed as playing manager in 2006 Empress's Cup in December.

National team statistics

References

External links

1975 births
Living people
Association football people from Tottori Prefecture
Japanese women's footballers
Japan women's international footballers
Nadeshiko League players
Nikko Securities Dream Ladies players
OKI FC Winds players
TEPCO Mareeze players
Japanese women's football managers
1991 FIFA Women's World Cup players
1995 FIFA Women's World Cup players
2003 FIFA Women's World Cup players
Olympic footballers of Japan
Footballers at the 1996 Summer Olympics
Footballers at the 2004 Summer Olympics
Asian Games medalists in football
Footballers at the 1998 Asian Games
Footballers at the 2002 Asian Games
Women's association football forwards
Asian Games bronze medalists for Japan
Medalists at the 1998 Asian Games
Medalists at the 2002 Asian Games